Dibyendu Palit (5 March 1939 – 3 January 2019) was an Indian writer of Bengali poems, novels, and short stories. His first story Chandapatan was published in 1955 in the Sunday edition of Anandabazar Patrika.

Biography 
Dibyendu Palit, born at Bhagalpur in Bihar, British India, was the second eldest son of the Palit Family, and a brother of four sons and six daughters of Bagalacharan Palit and Niharbala Palit. He lost his father at a very young age, and took responsibility of his family. His struggling days were a source of inspiration for most of his writing. Later he did a master's degree in comparative literature at Jadavpur University. His son Amitendu Palit, is an eminent IES officer and economist. Palit resided at Gariahat in Kolkata.

In 2005, Shyamanand Jalan directed film Eashwar Mime Co., an adaptation of Dibyendu Palit's story, Mukhabhinoy, by noted playwright Vijay Tendulkar. The film is story of a travelling mime company selling products and a writer's views upon its journey. It has two leads Ashish Vidyarthi playing the role of mime company's owner while Pawan Malhotra did the role of the writer. Though it did not receive a commercial release it was screened at Durban International Film Festival, the 3 Continents Festival and the Kolkata Film Festival. Palit died on 3 January 2019 at the age of 79 in Kolkata.

Select bibliography
Sheet Grismer Smriti
Shindu Barowa Dheu
Samparka
Shahajodhha
Anubhab
Golpo-shongroho (collected stories)
Shreshto golpo (selected stories)
The Faces and Other Stories (selected stories) 
Nirbason Ny, Nirbachon
Sabdo Chai, Dao
Kichu Sriti kichu Apoman
Ahoto Arjun
Rajar Bari Onek Dure

Stories
Mukhguli
Mukabhinoy
Sukresoni
Chilekotha
Alomer nijer Bari
Munnir songe kichukkhon
Ruth o onnanyo galpo

Novels
Antordhan: had a powerful screen adaptation of Tapan Sinha
Aboidho
Anusaran
Swapner Bhitor
Dheu
Sahojhoddha
Sabuj Gandho
AEka
Bristir Pore
Binidro
 The Golden Life

Awards and honors
Ananda Purashkar (1984)
Bankim Puraskar (1990)
Sahitya Akademi Award (1998)
Syed Mustafa Siraj Akademi Award (2016)

References

External links
Books of Dibyendu Palit

Writers from Kolkata
1939 births
2019 deaths
Bengali writers
Bengali novelists
Bengali Hindus
20th-century Bengali poets
21st-century Bengali poets
20th-century Bengalis
21st-century Bengalis
Bengali male poets
Bengali poets
Poets from Bihar
University of Calcutta alumni
Recipients of the Ananda Purashkar
Recipients of the Sahitya Akademi Award in Bengali
People from Bhagalpur
Novelists from Bihar
Indian novelists
Indian poets
Indian male poets
Indian male novelists
Indian male writers
Indian short story writers
Indian male short story writers
Indian journalists
Indian male journalists
Indian essayists
Indian male essayists
Indian newspaper journalists
Indian editors
Indian newspaper editors
Indian advertising people
20th-century Indian poets
20th-century Indian novelists
20th-century Indian male writers
20th-century Indian writers
20th-century Indian short story writers
20th-century Indian essayists
21st-century Indian poets
21st-century Indian novelists
21st-century Indian male writers
21st-century Indian writers
21st-century Indian short story writers
21st-century Indian essayists